Ono San Pietro is a town and comune in the province of Brescia, in Lombardy. It is located in the Camonica valley, above the right bank of the river Oglio, and at the foot of Mt. Concarena. Neighbouring communes are Capo di Ponte, Cerveno, Ceto and Paisco Loveno.

References

External links

Cities and towns in Lombardy